Sam Fisher (born 17 May 2001) is a Scottish professional footballer who plays as a defender for Dundee. He has also played on loan for East Kilbride, Forfar Athletic (in three separate spells) and Dunfermline Athletic.

Career 
Fisher joined Lowland Football League side East Kilbride on loan in September 2019. Fisher's season was cut short due to an ACL injury picked up in a reserve game, which required surgery and kept him out for six to nine months.

After making his return, Fisher signed a new deal with Dundee, keeping him at the club until 2023. He then immediately joined Scottish League One side Forfar Athletic on loan until January. Fisher made his league debut in a scoreless draw at home against Dumbarton. In January 2021, following the three-week suspension of League One by the SFA and SPFL due to the worsening COVID-19 situation in Scotland, Fisher was recalled by Dundee.

Fisher made his first start for Dundee in January 2021, in an away loss to Raith Rovers. He would come on as a substitute in a home win over Arbroath. Fisher would make four league appearances in total during the season, and would be an unused substitute when Dundee defeated Kilmarnock to win the Premiership play-offs and achieve promotion to the Premiership.

In July 2021, Fisher would return on loan to Forfar Athletic, now in the Scottish League Two. In August, Fisher would suffer an injury during training which would "rule him out for some time." After sitting on the bench for the previous few games, Fisher would make his return to the pitch against Angus rivals Arbroath in the Scottish Cup. After making a league start shortly after, Fisher would again suffer injury misfortune, taking a knock which worried manager Gary Irvine. Fortunately this time, Fisher would recover much quicker and would return on Boxing Day, scoring his first senior goal for the Loons in a home game against Stenhousemuir. On 29 January 2022, Fisher was recalled by Dundee. He returned on loan to Forfar on 3 February for the remainder of the season.

On 16 August 2022, Fisher joined Scottish League One side Dunfermline Athletic on a season-long loan. He would make his debut off the bench on 3 September, in an away league victory over Queen of the South. Fisher would be named to SPFL's Team of the Week in October after keeping a clean sheet and creating the winning goal in a league victory over F.C. Edinburgh. After impressing throughout his loan spell with the Pars and helping them top League One, Fisher was recalled by Dundee on 20 January 2023. The following week, Fisher played his first league game of the season for Dundee at right back, and helped defeat league leaders Queen's Park in a 3–0 victory.

Career Statistics

References 

Living people
People from Tillicoultry
Scottish footballers
Association football defenders
2001 births
Scottish Professional Football League players
Dundee F.C. players
Forfar Athletic F.C. players
Dunfermline Athletic F.C. players
Lowland Football League players
East Kilbride F.C. players